Pao On v. Lau Yiu Long [1979] UKPC 17 is a contract law appeal case from the Court of Appeal of Hong Kong decided by the Judicial Committee of the Privy Council, concerning consideration and duress. It is relevant for English contract law.

Facts
Fu Chip Investment Co. Ltd., a newly formed public company, majority owned by Lau Yiu Long and his younger brother Benjamin (the defendants), wished to buy a building called "Wing On", owned by Tsuen Wan Shing On Estate Co. Ltd. ("Shing On"), whose majority shareholder was Pao On and family (the claimants). Instead of simply selling the building for cash, Lau and Pao did a swap deal for the shares in their companies. Shing On would get 4.2m $1 shares in Fu Chip, and Fu Chip bought all the shares of Shing On. Fu Chip bought all the shares in Shing On, and Pao received as payment 4.2m shares in Fu Chip (worth $2.50 for each $1 share). To ensure the share price of Fu Chip suffered no shock, Pao agreed not to sell 60% of the shares for at least one year. Also, in case the share price dropped in that year, Lau agreed to buy 60% of the shares back from Pao at $2.50. But then Pao realised, if the share price rose over $2.50 in the year, the price would stay fixed and he would not get the gains. So he demanded that instead of that, Lau would merely indemnify Pao if the share price fell below $2.50. Pao made clear that unless he got this "guarantee agreement", he would not complete the main contract. It was signed on 4 May 1973. But as it turned out the shares did slump in value. Pao tried to enforce the guarantee agreement. Lau argued the guarantee agreement was not valid (1) because there was no consideration, only in the past and under a pre-existing duty, and (2) because it was a contract procured under duress.

Judgment
Lord Scarman, giving the Privy Council’s advice, first disposed of the question about past consideration, because a promise to perform a pre-existing contractual obligation to a third party can sometimes be good consideration. The question of whether consideration can be invalidated ‘if there has been a threat to repudiate a pre-existing contractual obligation or an unfair use of a dominating bargaining position’ was rejected because ‘where businessmen are negotiating at arm’s length it is unnecessary for the achievement of justice’. On the idea of past consideration, Lord Scarman said this:

On the point of duress, Lord Scarman held the following.

This was commercial pressure and no more, since the company really just wanted to avoid adverse publicity. For a general doctrine of economic duress, it must be shown ‘the victim’s consent to the contract was not a voluntary act on his part… provided always that the basis of such recognition is that it must amount to a coercion of will, which vitiates consent.’

See also

Iniquitous pressure in English law
Universe Tankships Inc of Monrovia v International Transport Workers’ Federation [1982] 2 All ER 67
Atlas Express Ltd. v. Kafco [1989] QB 833
North Ocean Shipping Co. Ltd. v. Hyundai Construction Co., Ltd. [1979] QB 705

Notes

References
PS Atiyah, 'Economic Duress and the Overborne Will' (1982) 98 LQR 197
D Tiplady, 'Concepts of Duress' (1983) 99 LQR 188
PS Atiyah, 'Duress and the Overborne Will Again' (1983) 99 LQR 353

English enforceability case law
English consideration case law
English duress case law
English unconscionability case law
Judicial Committee of the Privy Council cases on appeal from Hong Kong
1980 in case law
1980 in Hong Kong
1980 in British law